Victoria Murden McClure (born March 6, 1963) is an athlete, adventurer, chaplain, lawyer, and university administrator who was the first woman and the first American to row solo across the Atlantic Ocean, which she did in 1999. She was also the first woman and first American to ski to the geographic South Pole and the first woman to climb the Lewis Nunatak in the Antarctic. She is the president of Spalding University, a private Catholic university in Louisville, Kentucky. She also served as the Chair of the Board of the National Outdoor Leadership School (NOLS), an outdoor education school headquartered in Lander, Wyoming, that emphasizes environmental ethics and wilderness excursions.

Early life and education
McClure was born in Brooksville, Florida and as a child moved to Connecticut and then to Pennsylvania. At the age of fifteen, she moved in with her grandmother in Louisville, Kentucky, to attend the Louisville Collegiate School from which she graduated in 1981. She went on to Smith College, earning a bachelor's degree in psychology in 1985. She followed that with a Master of Divinity from Harvard Divinity School in 1989, a J.D. from the University of Louisville School of Law in 1995, and a Master of Fine Arts in writing from Spalding University.

Solo row across the Atlantic
Thirty-six years old at the time, she rowed for eighty-one days, traveling , starting from the Canary Islands and finishing at Guadeloupe on December 3, 1999. Her boat, Pearl, was twenty-three feet long, four feet high, and six feet wide and weighed about 1800 pounds. It was her second trip across the ocean, her first one cut short due to the hurricane season in 1998.

She wrote a memoir about her experiences, A Pearl in the Storm: How I Found My Heart in the Middle of the Ocean, published by HarperCollins in 2009.
She is also noted for her 700-mile ski across the South Pole (the first woman to ski to the South Pole), and she was the first woman to climb the Lewis Nunatak in the Antarctic.

Career
McClure has also worked as a chaplain at Boston City Hospital, the executive director of a shelter for homeless women, and a public policy analyst for the Mayor of Louisville, and she worked for the boxer and humanitarian Muhammad Ali. On June 1, 2010, she became the president of Spalding University, which is located in Louisville. She is the Chair of the Board of the National Outdoor Leadership School.

Honors and awards
 1988 – First woman and first American to reach the summit of the Lewis Nunatak in the Antarctic
 1989 – First woman and first American to ski to the geographic South Pole
 1989 – Named a Hopkin's Scholar at Harvard University
 1999 – First woman and first American to row across the Atlantic
 1999 – Received Kentucky Derby Festival's Silver Horse Shoe Award for courage, determination, and community service
 2000 – Received special Victor Award, given annually by the National Academy of Sports Editors to outstanding athletes
 2000 – Received the Peter Bird Trophy for Tenacity and Perseverance from the Ocean Rowing Society International
 2000 – HonoredIn what way? by European Academy of Sport

References

Resources

External links
A Pearl in the Storm Official Website

Living people
1963 births
American female rowers
Women academic administrators
Louisville Collegiate School alumni
Spalding University alumni
Smith College alumni
Harvard Divinity School alumni
University of Louisville alumni
People from Brooksville, Florida
People from Louisville, Kentucky
Place of birth missing (living people)
American explorers
Female polar explorers
American academic administrators
South Pole
21st-century American women